Trell is a given name. Notable people with the name include:

Trell Hooper (born 1961), American football player
Trell Kimmons (born 1985), American sprinter

See also
Trel (disambiguation)

Masculine given names